Capital punishment in Wisconsin was abolished in 1853. Wisconsin was one of the earliest United States states to abolish capital punishment, and is the only state that has performed only one execution in its history.

Since its admission to the Union in 1848, as the 30th State, the only execution carried out in Wisconsin was the botched execution of immigrant farmer John McCaffary, who was hanged on August 21, 1851, in Kenosha County for drowning his wife in a backyard cistern.

Wisconsin abolished the death penalty in 1853 just two years after McCaffary's execution.

In 2006, an advisory referendum showed 55.5% of Wisconsin voters were in favor of reinstating capital punishment. The state legislature did not adopt any statute to apply the popular vote.

See also
 Capital punishment in the United States

References

 
Legal history of Wisconsin
Wisconsin